Malian football clubs have participated in African football competitions since 1965. In total, Malian clubs have participated in African  competitions. The biggest success was the participation of  Stade Malien in the finals at the 2009 CAF Confederation Cup and Stade Malien and became the only Malian club to win a continental cup title, later Stade Malien was the only Malian club who appeared in the CAF Super Cup in 2010 where they lost the title to Democratic Congo's TP Mazembe.

Of the continental appearances, Djoliba and Stade Malien are one of the African clubs who appeared the most at continental competitions.

Appearances in CAF competitions
As of March 2017

African Cup of Champions Clubs/CAF Champions League

African (CAF) Cup Winner's Cup/CAF Confederation Cup

CAF Cup

CAF Super Cup

Notes
1 The match was finished 2-0 in favour of Djoliba, ASFA refused to play the penalty shootout due to arbitration, they were to be banned from CAF competitions for three years, no ban was put as ASFA Dakar participated the following season after winning their second championship title
2Djoliba was disqualified for not paying their debts to the CAF
3 Stade Malien succeeded as the Invincible Eleven fielded an ineligible player
4 On March 10, the Malian Football Federation (FEMAFOOT) was dissolved and effectively kicked out Malian clubs including Djoliba and Onze Créateurs out of competition and automatically Egypt's al-Masry awarded the away match 3-0 against Djoliba along with Rwanda's Rayon Sport against Onze Créateurs.  On March 17, FIFA suspended the Malian Football Federation (FEMAFOOT or FEMIFOOT) until early May

References

Football in Mali
African football clubs in international competitions